Maksym Andriyovych Mekhaniv (born 22 September 1996) is a Ukrainian professional footballer who plays as a goalkeeper for Ukrainian club Nyva Ternopil.

References

External links
 
 

1996 births
Living people
Ukrainian footballers
Association football goalkeepers
FC Ahron Velyki Hai players
FC Nyva Ternopil players
Ukrainian First League players
Ukrainian Second League players
Ukrainian Amateur Football Championship players
Sportspeople from Vinnytsia Oblast